Wabagai (Vidhan Sabha constituency) is one of the 60 assembly constituencies of Manipur a central Indian state. Wabagai is also part of Outer Manipur Lok Sabha constituency.

Members of Legislative Assembly
 1974: Habibur Rahaman, Indian National Congress
 1980: Abdul Salam, Independent
 1984: Mayengbam Manihar Singh, Independent
 1990: Mayengbam Manihar Singh,, Indian National Congress
 1995: Abdul Salam, Manipur Peoples Party
 2000: Mayengbam Manihar Singh, Indian National Congress
 2002: Abdul Salam, Indian National Congress
 2007: Dr. Usham Deben Singh, Communist Party of India
 2012: Fajur Rahim, Indian National Congress

Election results

2022

2017 result

See also
 List of constituencies of the Manipur Legislative Assembly
 Wabagai
 Thoubal district
 Outer Manipur (Lok Sabha constituency)

References

External link
 

Assembly constituencies of Manipur
Thoubal district